The Cascade River, part of the Ringarooma River catchment, is a perennial river located in the north-east region of Tasmania, Australia.

Location and features
The river rises below Bells Hill and flows generally north by west, through the Cascade Dam, and reaches its mouth near Derby where it merges with the Ringarooma River. The river descends  over its  course.

The river flooded in April 1929, following unusually heavy rains in northern Tasmania. At the time, the flood was the worst in Tasmanian history, lasting several days. Thousands of buildings were damaged and the death toll is variously reported to be between 14 and 22. After the 1929 Briseis Dam Disaster, a dam across the Cascade River was rebuilt in 1936 as the  Cascade Dam.

See also

References

Rivers of Tasmania
North East Tasmania